This is a list of monarchs of Tahiti, all of which belonged to the Pōmare dynasty. They carried the title Ari'i rahi.

Monarchs of Tahiti

Family tree

Current status 
In 2006, Tauatomo Mairau claimed to be the heir to the Tahitian throne, and attempted to re-assert the status of the monarchy in court. His claims were not recognized by France. On 28 May 2009, Joinville Pōmare, an adopted member of the Pōmare family, declared himself King Pōmare XI, during a ceremony attended by descendants of leading chiefs but spurned by members of his own family. Other members of the family recognised his uncle, Léopold Pōmare, as heir to the throne.

He attempted to have royal trust lands returned to him and his family. The French government mortgaged the land after World War II, and in doing so violated the terms of the agreement signed with Pōmare V in 1880 which reserved control of the trust lands for the royal family of Tahiti. The banks may be in the process of freezing the assets, and Mairau sued to prevent native Tahitians from being evicted from his trust lands, and wished for them to retain their usage rights over the land.

See also
 Kingdom of Tahiti
 List of royal consorts of Tahiti
 List of monarchs of Huahine
 List of monarchs of Raiatea
 List of monarchs of Bora Bora
 List of colonial and departmental heads of French Polynesia
 President of French Polynesia

References

External links

Tahiti
 
Rulers
Monarchs